ANS TV (also known as ANS Independent Broadcasting Media Company) was a news television channel in Azerbaijan, which was owned by ANS Group of Companies from its foundation on 26 November 1991 until its closure on 18 July 2016. Its name, ANS, stands for Azerbaijani News Service.

History
ANS was the first privately owned independent television company in the former Soviet Union. It has been described as a staunchly pro-government station.

In the early years of ANS' establishment, there were many local wars on the territory of the former Soviet Union. ANS TV got popularized by reporting news from the frontlines - Chechnya, Georgia, Ossetia, Karabakh, Abkhazia, Afghanistan, Ingushetia and frequently selling footage to BBC, CNN, NBC, ZDF, ARD, VOX, RAI, TF, Russia-1, CBS, TBS.

ANS TV was taken off the air in July 2016 when its broadcasting license was revoked after it had announced it was to broadcast an interview with Fethullah Gulen. Azerbaijan's National Television and Radio Council stated that the channel's license would be withdrawn permanently, accusing the station of "contradicting the strategic partnership between the Azeri and Turkish people by offering support to Fethullah Gulen and his supporters".

Bizimkiler
In the run up to Azerbaijan's success in the Eurovision Song Contest 2011, the station ran a project called Bizimkiler, which included top local musicians playing globally-known western tunes.

See also

ANS ChM

References

Television stations in Azerbaijan
Television networks in Azerbaijan
Azerbaijani-language television stations
Television channels and stations established in 1991
1991 establishments in Azerbaijan
1991 establishments in the Soviet Union
Television channels and stations disestablished in 2016
2016 disestablishments in Azerbaijan